Jo Coppola was a prominent 1950s columnist and television critic for Newsday and the New York Post.
She was the first TV critic Newsday ever had, and also wrote for Commonweal, and others.

In 1959 she wrote the script for the short film Summer of Decision, a 30 min long film produced by the Council on Social Work Education, directed by William A. Graham and starring Suzanne Pleshette, Kevin McCarthy and Nicholas Pryor.

Notable quotations

Notes

References
Jo Coppola, "Comedy on Television," Commonweal, 12 December 1958: 288
John Hadjuk (2008) Channels of Dissent: Ed Murrow, Mort Sahl, and Television's Lost Promise in The Montana Professor 18.2 Spring 2008
Keeler, Robert F. (1990) Newsday: a candid history of the respectable tabloid
Paul Krassner (1958) An angry Young Magazine, in The Realist, Issue No. 1, June–July 1958, p.2
Michael Williams (1958) Commonweal, Volume 69

Further reading
Daniel Wolf, Edwin Fancher (1962) The Village voice reader: a mixed bag from the Greenwich Village p. 215
Kathleen Collins (2009) Watching what we eat: the evolution of television cooking shows
James D Moser (1958) International Television Almanac

External links

American film critics
American women film critics
American columnists
American women columnists
American television critics